Aleksandar Nedeljkovic (born April 14, 1982) is a Serbian football player, who currently plays for SC Gradisce.

Career 
He played in the Serbian First League for FK Zemun and Zmaj Zemun. He joined in summer 2007 to German lower club FC Drita Kosova Kornwestheim and played since 2009 in Austria. First time presented until summer 2011 SV Aspern and since them for SC Gradisce Vienna.

Sources

1982 births
Living people
People from Zemun
Footballers from Belgrade
Serbian footballers
Expatriate footballers in Austria
FK Zemun players
Serbian expatriate sportspeople in Germany
Association football forwards
Serbian expatriate sportspeople in Austria
Expatriate footballers in Germany